Riccardo Bertozzi (born 12 February 1996) is an Italian footballer who plays as a goalkeeper for Serie D side Caratese.

Club career
Bertozzi played on youth level at Parma and Pro Piacenza. He made his professional debut in the latter club on 16 April 2016, in the 31st round of 2015–16 season of Lega Pro, against Renate, playing 90 minutes. He signed to Arezzo on 1 February 2019, weeks before the exclusion of Piacenza.

On 9 August 2019, he signed with Piacenza.

References

Sources
 
 

1996 births
Living people
People from Segrate
Footballers from Lombardy
Association football goalkeepers
Italian footballers
Parma Calcio 1913 players
A.S. Pro Piacenza 1919 players
S.S. Arezzo players
Piacenza Calcio 1919 players
U.S. Folgore Caratese A.S.D. players
Serie C players
Serie D players
Sportspeople from the Metropolitan City of Milan